Angelo Campos Oliveira (born 30 March 2000) is a Swiss professional footballer who plays as a forward for Brühl.

Club career
On 20 August 2021, he joined Brühl on a half-season loan.

Career statistics

Club

Notes

References

2000 births
People from Chur
Sportspeople from Graubünden
Swiss people of Portuguese descent
Living people
Swiss men's footballers
Switzerland youth international footballers
Association football forwards
FC Chur 97 players
FC St. Gallen players
SC Brühl players
Swiss 1. Liga (football) players
Swiss Super League players
Swiss Promotion League players